Nahom is a place referenced in the Book of Mormon as one of the stops on the Old World segment of Lehi's journey. This location is referred to as the place where Ishmael is laid to rest. It was also at this location that the path of Lehi's journey changed from a southern to an eastern direction before continuing toward the coast and the land Bountiful. (See Archaeology and the Book of Mormon.)

Some LDS believe that they have located the site of Nahom based on the discovery of an altar in Yemen in  the Jawf valley with the inscription "NHM" and the greater tribal region is marked on several maps from the 1700s as Nehhm. Critics doubt the link between the Book of Mormon Nahom and the settlement with the NHM altar.

Nahom in the Book of Mormon
In , Lehi receives the Liahona and his group departs from the Valley of Lemuel. After traveling for four days in "nearly a south-southeast direction" they make camp in a place they name "Shazer." They continue to travel in the "same direction" for "many days" with the Liahona as a guide. Verses 34 and 35 read:

In the next four verses, the dissenters plot to kill Lehi and Nephi, but the threat is not carried out. The next verse reports that Lehi's group has resumed their journey and changed the direction of their travel "eastward".

Nahom in archaeology
LDS scholars have proposed a specific location for Nahom based on archaeological evidences, which overrides previous speculation.  Others give a linguistical reason for which the proposed location does not match the Nahom descriptions given in the Book of Mormon.

Ancient frankincense trails
Some LDS scholars believe that Lehi's group followed the ancient frankincense trails in the northern part of Yemen at times during the initial leg of their journey . The location of NHM is near the main junction of these ancient trails at a point where the trails veer to the east.
According to the Book of Mormon, prior to their arrival at Nahom, the travelers had been moving in a "south-southeast" direction. It was at this location "Nahom" that the Book of Mormon states that the travelers made a significant change in direction "eastward" before continuing their journey toward the coast. The location of NHM and the eastward change in direction have been used by LDS scholars to assist in determining a plausible location for the coastal location referred to by Nephi as Bountiful.

Proposed location of Nahom
In 1976, it was originally speculated by Lynn M. Hilton that Nahom might correlate with the location of the village of Al Qunfudhah, Tanomah, in Saudi Arabia . In 1978 Ross T. Christensen noted the existence of a location in Yemen called "Nehhm" on an early map produced by Carsten Niebuhr as the result of a scientific expedition sent out by King Frederick V of Denmark . After doing extensive research over several years at the site in Yemen, the location of Nahom was associated with the existing location and tribal name NHM (usually vocalized as NIHM or NEHEM or NAHM) by Warren and Michaela Aston in 1994 . LDS scholars now consider the location and tribal area of NHM in the Jawf Valley in Yemen (15° 51' 0" North, 44° 37' 0" East, GPS coordinates 15.88, 44.615) to be the only plausible location for the place referred to as Nahom in the Book of Mormon.

LDS scholars consider NHM to be one of the locations in the Arabian peninsula that they believe confirms Book of Mormon historicity in the Old World .  Terryl Givens states that the discovery of the altars "may thus be said to constitute the first actual archaeological evidence for the historicity of the Book of Mormon." This conclusion is based upon archaeological evidence and inscriptions recently found on altars at a specific location in Yemen which appear to correlate with the "place called Nahom" described in the book of 1 Nephi ,. Nahom is one of only a very few locations mentioned in the Book of Mormon that the text implies had been named prior to contact with the Lehite travelers, in contrast to Lehi's normal application of the Middle Eastern practice of naming locations after family members .

Although the actual location of NHM is plausible when compared to Lehi's purported route, his change of direction on the Arabian peninsula, the timeframe (~600 BC) matching the archaeological dates, and the ancient burial ground found there, one non-LDS author has suggested a reason why Nahom and NHM may not represent the same location: the pronunciation of NHM is unknown .

Altars
The Bar'an temple in Marib ( east of San'a in Yemen) was excavated by a German archaeological team led by Burkhard Vogt. Before excavation began, all that was visible at the Bar'an site were six columns projecting above the sand. The temple structure and many of the altars were found to be well preserved by the sand and desert climate . One of the artifacts discovered at this location was an inscribed altar which has been dated to the seventh or sixth centuries BC. According to the inscription, the altar was donated to the temple by "Bi'athtar, son of Sawad, son of Naw'an, the Nihmite" . The first altar discovered was removed from the Bar'an site and placed in a traveling exhibit which began touring Europe in October 1997. Since that time, two additional altars bearing the same inscription mentioning NHM have been identified at the same temple site .

Each of the altars is constructed of solid limestone. All three contain a dedication inscription, which is carved around all four sides of the altars in the South Arabian script of that period, and each bears the name of their donor: Bi'athar . The first altar was dated to between the seventh and sixth centuries B.C by French researcher Christian Robin . Since Naw'um of the tribe of Nihm was the grandfather of Bi'athar, it is estimated that the Nihm tribal name must be at least two generations older than the altars themselves .

Nahom and linguistics

Meaning of the name NHM
Vowels in Hebrew are spoken but not written. Therefore, roots in Semitic languages such as Hebrew or Arabic utilize only the consonants and not the vowels . Some of the variant names based upon the Semitic root NHM found in both Arabic and Hebrew texts are Nahum, Naham, Nihm, Nehem and Nahm . The root NHM has different meanings. The South Arabian root NHM is related to stone cutting. The Hebrew root NHM is found repeatedly in the Bible and relates to sorrow, hunger, consoling, and mourning . Scholars consider this root appropriate when used to refer to a place of burial and the expression of mourning . This burial complex is the largest such burial area known anywhere in Arabia .

Early references to NHM
The name NHM denotes both a tribal region and a location in the southern part of Arabia . In 1792 Robert Heron published a two-volume translation of Niebuhr's first work titled Niebuhr's Travels through Arabia and Other Countries in the East . Niebuhr explained in his book: "I have had no small difficulty in writing down these names; both from the diversity of dialects in the country, and from the indistinct pronunciation of those from whom I was obliged to ask them." There is no evidence, however, that Joseph Smith had access to these materials before the publication of the Book of Mormon. Likewise, there is also no evidence that he or one of his acquaintances did not have access to these sources. .

Link between Nahom and NHM
In the Book of Mormon, Nahom is one of the few locations mentioned in the Book of Mormon that was not named by Lehi, thus suggesting that this was a pre-existing place name. The Book of Mormon states that Ishmael, the patriarch of the family that left with Lehi's, was buried "in the place which was called Nahom." It was also at Nahom that the travelers made a significant change in the direction of their travel from "south-southeast" to "nearly eastward."

Criticisms of connection

Known criticisms include the following :

The fact that the Book of Mormon does not explicitly mention contact with outsiders during Lehi's journey. This criticism fails to acknowledge the text of the Book of Mormon implies that was an existing name for the place and not one Lehi and his family gave: "And it came to pass that Ishmael died, and was buried in the place which was called Nahom." (1 Nephi 16:34) Other times it is clear Lehi and his family named locations: "we did call the name of the place Shazer" (1 Nephi 16:13).
 
 
It is suggested that the pronunciation of NHM is unknown and may not relate to Nahom at all. 
It has been suggested that Joseph Smith simply created the name Nahom as a variant of the Biblical names Naham (1 Chron. 4:19), Nehum (Ne. 7:7) and Nahum (Na. 1:1), although this fails to account for the plausible placement of the actual location of NHM relative to the description of Lehi's journey in the Book of Mormon narrative.

It has been said that the link between Nahom and Nehhm, as spelled in Niebuhr's work, is invalid because the vowels between the names Nahom and Nehhm do not match, stating that "only three of the five letters in Nehhm agree with the spelling Nahom. The second letter in Nehhm is e rather than a, and the fourth letter is h instead of o. The variant spellings of Nehem, Nehm, Nihm, Nahm and Naham, do not really help to solve the problem." Some indicate that modern vowel variance is to be expected because Hebrew does not have written vowels. The current pronunciation of the location and tribal area is said to be Nihm or Nehem or Nahm rather than Nahom. One critic states that the time from Ishmael's death to now (~2600 years) is not long enough to account for the change in pronunciation, although scholars indicate that historical variation in root pronunciation (possibly due to Arabic influence) may allow for this change.

Dating of NHM
Latter-day Saint scholars argue that the NHM does indeed date to Lehi's time. The inscriptions on "small votive altars given to the Bar'an Temple near Marib by a certain Bicathar of the tribe of Nihm" date to "seventh and sixth centuries BC". Lehi's family is believed to have left Jerusalem in the sixth century.

Notes

References

.
.
.
.
.
.
.
.
.
.
.
.
.
.
.
.
.
.
.

Archaeological sites in Yemen
Book of Mormon places